Florence Edwards Borders (February 24, 1924 – September 7, 2018) was an American archivist, historian, and librarian. She specialized in the preservation of African American historical artifacts, especially those related to Afro-Louisianans.

Early life and education 
Florence Borders was born on February 24, 1924, in New Iberia, Louisiana. 18 months later, she and her family moved to New Orleans. She graduated from McDonogh #35 High School and attended Southern University in Baton Rouge, her father's alma mater, for a BA in English. She attended Rosary College, now Dominican University, for a second bachelor's degree and a master's in Library Science.

Borders completed her Post-Masters Study at Louisiana State University's Graduate Library Sciences School and continued to study at several universities and institutions across the country, including the Library and Archives Institute of the Ohio Historical Society, Atlanta University, Case-Western Reserve University, the Ford Foundation Institute at Hofstra University, the National Archives, the Library of Congress Institute in Philadelphia, and the Society of Southwest Archivists Institute in Dallas.

She and husband James B. Borders III had two sons, James IV and Sylvanus Edwards, and one daughter, Thais.

Career 
In the 1940s, Borders worked as a library assistant at the University of Chicago: the first African-American librarian hired by the school.

She later went on to become a librarian at Bethune-Cookman College where she met her husband, a musician and educator named James B. Borders III.

She held other similar positions at Tennessee State University and Grambling State University before she trained to become an archivist and in 1970, returned home to New Orleans.

From 1970-1989, Borders served as the senior archivist and "pioneer staff member" of the Amistad Research Center before retiring. However, only five months after retiring, she returned to work as head archivist for the Center for African and African-American Studies at Southern University (SUNO) from 1989 until her retirement almost 20 years later. As a scholar, she was active in engaging and promoting New Orleans and South Louisiana culture.

The Amistad Research Center holds the Florence Borders papers, 1933-2007, which includes many of her personal papers, essays, archival aids, interviews, and research.

She curated and organized many exhibits over her career through Amistad, Chicory, and SUNO. One of her projects at Amistad was as sole processor of the Thomas C. Dent Papers, 1972-1000.

She began attending meetings of the Society of American Archivists in the 1970s and in the 1980s, she helped establish the SAA Task Force on Minorities, now the Archivists and Archives of Color.

Publications and media 
Borders co-founded the scholarly journal Chicory Review which focuses on African-American history and culture. She has also published many of her own articles in Callaloo, the Black Music Research Journal, Louisiana Library Bulletin, and in her own journal, Chicory Review where she served as Editor.

She frequently lectured at events and conferences and served as research consultant for several films and oral histories. She worked as a researcher for The Rise and Fall of Jim Crow and her appeared in Liberty Street Blues. Marlon Riggs drew on her expertise for his documentary "Black Is, Black Ain't," she was consulted for the film "House Divided," and coordinated many interviews for the oral history project "Behind the Veil: The Jim Crow Era."

Death 
She died on September 7, 2018, in New Orleans.

Affiliations 

 Charter member of the Society of American Archivists since 1970s
 Zeta Phi Beta sorority
 President of the New Orleans' chapter of the B Sharp Music Club
 Founder of Chicory Society of Afro-Louisiana History and Culture
 Vice President of Our Lady of Lourdes School Board
 Grants review committee of the Arts Council of New Orleans
 Consultant for the Neighborhood Revitalization Project of the Claiborne Corridor
 Consultant for Louisiana World Exposition Afro-American Pavilion
 Executive Board of Directors for Louisiana Archives and Manuscripts Association
 Greater New Orleans Archivists
 Charter Member of the Academy of Certified Archivists
 Third World Archivists

Awards and honors 
 Unsung Heroes Plaque awarded by the Crescent City Chapter of Links, 1987
 Mayor's Certificate of Merit awarded by the City of New Orleans, 1987
 The Callaloo Award from the University of Virginia, 1988
 Vital as a Heartbeat Award from the Urban League, 1988
 Certificate of Appreciation awarded by the Society of American Archivists, 2000

References 

1924 births
2018 deaths
American archivists
American librarians
American women librarians
Female archivists
Southern University alumni
University of Chicago staff
Dominican University (Illinois) alumni
American women historians
African-American historians
20th-century American historians
African-American librarians
Bethune–Cookman University people
Grambling State University people
Academic journal editors
School board members in Louisiana
20th-century African-American writers
21st-century African-American people
20th-century African-American women writers
20th-century American women writers
21st-century African-American women